George Hall (1753 – 23 November 1811) was an academic at Trinity College Dublin, who served as the fourth Erasmus Smith's Professor of Mathematics from 1799 to 1800, as Provost of the college from 1806 to 1811, and the Church of Ireland Bishop of Dromore for a few days before his death in 1811.

Life
Son of the Rev. Mark Hall, of Northumberland, he was born there, but soon thereafter his family moved to in Ireland. His first employment was as an assistant-master in Dr. Darby's school near Dublin. Having entered Trinity College Dublin, 1 November 1770, under the tutorship of the Rev. Gerald Fitzgerald, he was elected a scholar in 1773; he graduated B.A. 1775, M.A. 1778, B.D. 1786, and D.D. 1790. He was a successful candidate for a fellowship in 1777, and on 14 May 1790 he was co-opted a senior fellow. Along with his fellowship he filled various academical offices, being elected Archbishop King's lecturer in divinity 1790–1, regius professor of Greek 1790 and 1795, Erasmus Smith's Professor of Modern History 1791, and Erasmus Smith's Professor of Mathematics 1799.

Hall resigned his fellowship and professorship in 1800, and on 25 February of that year was presented by his college to the rectory of Ardstraw in the diocese of Derry. In 1806 he returned to Trinity College, having been appointed to the provostship by patent dated 22 January, and held that office until his promotion, on 13 November 1811, to the bishopric of Dromore. He was consecrated in the college chapel on the 17th of the same month, but died on the 23rd in the provost's house, from which he had not had time to move. He was buried in the college chapel, where a monument with a Latin inscription to his memory was erected by his niece, Margaret Stack. There was another memorial to him, in the parish church of Ardstraw.

References

Attribution

1753 births
1811 deaths
Anglican bishops of Dromore
Fellows of Trinity College Dublin
Provosts of Trinity College Dublin